Lightness may refer to:
 Lightness, a property of a color
 Lightness (philosophy), a philosophical concept most closely associated with continental philosophy and existentialism, which is used in ontology
 A relatively low weight, mass or density of an object or material